El Mahdi Youssoufi (born September 18, 1998) is a Moroccan football player who plays for New York City FC II in the MLS Next Pro.

Playing career

Youth
In his childhood, El Mahdi Youssoufi passed through and graduated from the Mohammed VI Football Academy. At both under-15 and under-19 level he finished the season as the team's top scorer while also winning the league. After leaving them, he signed for Moroccan top tier side FUS Rabat.

College & amateur
In 2019 Youssoufi applied for the Second Chance program, in which young Moroccans are able to study in an American university on a joint footballing and academic course; he would pick a degree in Management at St. Francis College in Brooklyn. He would study there for three years before graduating; in that time he would play 39 games, scoring 21 goals.

While at college, Youssoufi also appeared in the USL League Two with Toledo Villa, making three appearances in 2021.

Senior
After graduation, El Mahdi Youssoufi was selected for the 2022 MLS SuperDraft. He was selected by MLS Cup holders New York City FC as the 84th pick in the third round. By being selected he became the first Second Chance player to join an American club and the first player from St. Francis College to be selected in the SuperDraft. He would ultimately sign for their MLS Next Pro side, New York City FC II, being announced on March 24 as one of their players for their inaugural season.

His competitive debut came as a substitute in a 7–0 defeat of Inter Miami II on April 16, 2022  and his first start would come two weeks later, in a loss to Philadelphia Union II. His first goal came on May 8, the final goal in a 4–1 win over Toronto FC II.

Career statistics
.

References 

1998 births
Moroccan footballers
Association football forwards
Living people
St. Francis Brooklyn Terriers men's soccer players
Fath Union Sport players
New York City FC II players
MLS Next Pro players
USL League Two players
New York City FC draft picks